Cychrus thibetanus is a species of ground beetle in the subfamily of Carabinae. It was described by Fairmaire in 1893.

References

thibetanus
Beetles described in 1893